Necks is an EP by Thunderbirds Are Now! The album was released by Conspirators in Sound on May 24, 2005.

Track listing
"Essentially, It's A Viking Funeral Hymn For Those Whom Hath Sired Red-Haired Beerzerkers." – 0:58
"Surrounded By Skanks" – 3:31
"Bodies Adjust" – 3:23
"... & The Chocolate Mustache" – 1:59
"Pink Motorcycle Helmet (Patrick Dempsey Remix)" – 2:22
"Do The Splitz And Say 'Neat!'" – 4:26

External links
Thunderbirds are Now! official site
Action Driver Records

2005 EPs
Thunderbirds Are Now! albums